Barton Point Nature Reserve is a 680 ha strict nature reserve on the atoll of Diego Garcia in the British Indian Ocean Territory.  It lies at the northern end of the eastern side of the atoll.  It holds a breeding colony of red-footed boobies, with over 16,000 pairs recorded in a 2004 survey, for which it was identified as an Important Bird Area by BirdLife International.  The reserve is also the site of the Barton Point Atoll Restoration Project, a pilot scheme to remove introduced and invasive coconut palms and replant native hardwood trees.

References

Important Bird Areas of the British Indian Ocean Territory
Seabird colonies
Geography of the British Indian Ocean Territory
Nature reserves